Moray eels, or Muraenidae, are a family of eels whose members are found worldwide. There are approximately 200 species in 15 genera which are almost exclusively marine, but several species are regularly seen in brackish water, and a few are found in fresh water.

The English name, from the early 17th century, derives from Portuguese , which itself derives from Latin , in turn from Greek , ; these are the Latin and Greek names of the Mediterranean moray.

Anatomy
The dorsal fin extends from just behind the head along the back and joins seamlessly with the caudal and anal fins. Most species lack pectoral and pelvic fins, adding to their serpentine appearance. Their eyes are rather small; morays rely mostly on their highly developed sense of smell, lying in wait to ambush prey.

The body is generally patterned. In some species, the inside of the mouth is also patterned. Their jaws are wide, framing a protruding snout. Most possess large teeth used to tear flesh or grasp slippery prey. A relatively small number of species, for example the snowflake moray (Echidna nebulosa) and zebra moray (Gymnomuraena zebra), primarily feed on crustaceans and other hard-shelled animals, and they have blunt, molar-like teeth suitable for crushing.

Morays secrete a protective mucus over their smooth, scaleless skin, which in some species contains a toxin. They have much thicker skin and high densities of goblet cells in the epidermis that allows mucus to be produced at a higher rate than in other eel species. This allows sand granules to adhere to the sides of their burrows in sand-dwelling morays, thus making the walls of the burrow more permanent due to the glycosylation of mucins in mucus. Their small, circular gills, located on the flanks far posterior to the mouth, require the moray to maintain a gap to facilitate respiration.

Jaw 
The pharyngeal jaws of morays are located farther back in the head and closely resemble the oral jaws (complete with tiny "teeth"). When feeding, morays launch these jaws into the mouth cavity, where they grasp prey and transport it into the throat. Moray eels are the only known animals that use pharyngeal jaws to actively capture and restrain prey in this way. In addition to the presence of pharyngeal jaws, morays' mouth openings extend far back into the head, compared to fish which feed using suction. In the action of lunging at prey and biting down, water flows out the posterior side of the mouth opening, reducing waves in front of the eel which would otherwise displace prey. Thus, aggressive predation is still possible even with reduced bite times. In at least one species, the California moray (Gymnothorax mordax), teeth in the roof of the mouth are able to fold down as prey slides backwards, thus preventing the teeth from breaking and maintaining a hold on prey as it is transported to the throat.

Differing shapes of the jaw and teeth reflect the respective diets of different species of moray eel. Evolving separately multiple times within the Muraenidae family, short, rounded jaws and molar-like teeth allow durophagous eels (e.g. zebra moray and genus Echidna) to consume crustaceans, while other piscivorous genera of Muraenidae have pointed jaws and longer teeth. These morphological patterns carry over to teeth positioned on the pharyngeal jaw.

Feeding-behavior
Morays are opportunistic, carnivorous predators and feed primarily on smaller fish, crabs, and octopuses. A spotted moray eel has been observed eating a red lionfish without harm. Groupers, barracudas and sea snakes are among their few known predators, making many morays (especially the larger species) apex predators in their ecosystems.

Cooperative hunting
Reef-associated roving coral groupers (Plectropomus pessuliferus) have been observed recruiting giant morays to help them hunt. The invitation to hunt is initiated by head-shaking. This style of hunting may allow morays to flush prey from niches not accessible to groupers.

Habitat

The moray eel can be found in both fresh and saltwater habitats. The vast majority of species are strictly marine, never entering freshwater. Of the few species known to live in freshwater, the most well-known is Gymnothorax polyuranodon.

Within the marine realm, morays are found in shallow water nearshore areas, continental slopes, continental shelves, deep benthic habitats, and mesopelagic zones of the ocean, and in both tropical and temperate environments. Tropical oceans are typically located near the equator, whereas temperate oceans are typically located away from the equator. Most species are found in tropical or subtropical environments, with only a few species (yellow moray) found in temperate ocean environments.

Although the moray eel can occupy both tropical oceans and temperate oceans, as well as both freshwater and saltwater, the majority of moray eels occupy warm saltwater environments, which contain reefs. Within the tropical oceans and temperate oceans, the moray eel occupies shelters, such as dead patch reefs and coral rubble rocks, and less frequently occupies live coral reefs.

Taxonomy

Genera 

There are currently around 202 known species of moray eels, divided among 16 genera. These genera fall into the two sub-families of Muraeninae and Uropterygiinae, which can be distinguished by the location of their fins.  In Muraeninae the dorsal fin is found near the gill slits and runs down the back of the eel, while the anal fin is behind the anus.  The Uropterygiinnae, on the other hand, are defined by both their dorsal and anal fin being located at the end of their tails.  Though this distinction can be seen between the two sub-families, there are still many varieties of genera within Muraeninae and Uropterygiinae.  Of these, the genus Gymnothorax is by far the broadest, including more than half of the total number of species.

List of genera according to the World Register of Marine Species :
 Subfamily Muraeninae
 Genus Diaphenchelys — 1 species
 Genus Echidna — 11 species
 Genus Enchelycore — 13 species
 Genus Enchelynassa — 1 species
 Genus Gymnomuraena — 1 species
 Genus Gymnothorax — 125 species
 Genus Monopenchelys — 1 species
 Genus Muraena — 10 species
 Genus Pseudechidna — 1 species
 Genus Rhinomuraena — 1 species
 Genus Strophidon — 1 species
 Subfamily Uropterygiinae
 Genus Anarchias — 11 species
 Genus Channomuraena — 2 species
 Genus Cirrimaxilla — 1 species
 Genus Scuticaria — 2 species
 Genus Uropterygius — 20 species

Evolution 
The moray eel's elongation is due to an increase in the number of vertebrae, rather than a lengthening of each individual vertebra or a substantial decrease in body depth. Vertebrae have been added asynchronously between the pre-tail ("precaudal") and tail ("caudal") regions, unlike other groups of eels such as Ophicthids and Congrids.

Relationship with humans

Aquarium trade 
Several moray species are popular among aquarium hobbyists for their hardiness, flexible diets, and disease resistance. The most commonly traded species are the snowflake, zebra and goldentail moray (Gymnothorax miliaris). Several other species are occasionally seen, but are more difficult to obtain and can command a steep price on the market.

Food poisoning 

Moray eels, particularly the giant moray (Gymnothorax javanicus) and yellow-edged moray (G. flavimarginatus), are known to accumulate high levels of ciguatoxins, unlike other reef fish; if consumed by humans, ciguatera fish poisoning may result. Ciguatera is characterised by neurological, gastrointestinal, and cardiovascular problems that may persist for days after eating tainted fish. In morays, the toxins are most concentrated in the liver. In an especially remarkable instance, 57 people in the Northern Mariana Islands were poisoned after eating just the head and half of a cooked yellow-edged moray. Thus, morays are not recommended for human consumption.

References

Further reading 

 Gross, Miriam J.. The Moray Eel. United States: Rosen Publishing Group's PowerKids Press, 2005.
 Purser, Phillip. Keeping Moray Eels in Aquariums. United States: T.F.H., 2005.
 Didier, Dominique A.. Moray Eel. United States: Cherry Lake Publishing, 2014.
 Goldish, Meish. Moray Eel: Dangerous Teeth. United Kingdom: Bearport Publishing, 2009.

External links 

 Moray Eels Grab Prey With Alien Jaws
 Smith, J.L.B. 1962. The moray eels of the Western Indian Ocean and the Red Sea. Ichthyological Bulletin; No. 23. Department of Ichthyology, Rhodes University, Grahamstown, South Africa.

Articles containing video clips
Extant Miocene first appearances
Taxa named by Constantine Samuel Rafinesque